Jean Lessard (5 August 1932 – 27 April 2013) was a Canadian former alpine skier who competed in the 1960 Winter Olympics.

References

1932 births
2013 deaths
Canadian male alpine skiers
Olympic alpine skiers of Canada
Alpine skiers at the 1960 Winter Olympics